Pseudaelara sellaemontis is a species of beetle in the family Cerambycidae, and the only species in the genus Pseudaelara. It was described by Heller in 1912.

References

Apomecynini
Beetles described in 1912
Monotypic beetle genera